Najas pseudogracillima, called the Hong Kong water nymph, is an aquatic plant growing in fresh water ponds. It is a rare and little-known species known from one collection from a pond on the campus of Chung Chi College at the Chinese University of Hong Kong. It is very similar to N. gracillima except that the male inflorescences lack a spathe.

References

pseudogracillima
Aquatic plants
Flora of Hong Kong
Flora of China
Plants described in 1988